Enuff Z'Nuff is the debut studio album by American glam metal band Enuff Z'Nuff, released in 1989 on Atco Records. This debut album continues to be the best selling album in the band's catalog. The album's first single, "New Thing", received steady radio and MTV airplay, peaking at No. 67 on the Billboard Hot 100. Their follow-up single, a ballad called "Fly High Michelle," would prove to be the band's biggest hit, peaking at No. 47 on the same chart. Promotional CDs were created for another song, a ballad called "For Now," but this single was apparently cancelled while the band focused on their follow-up record, 1991's Strength. By 1991 the album had sold 300,000 copies.

Additional exposure for the album occurred with the album tracks "Hot Little Summer Girl" and "I Could Never Be Without You" being featured on the popular TV shows Beverly Hills, 90210 and Northern Exposure. A few years later, the band's glam appearance in their video for "Fly High Michelle" would be parodied on MTV's Beavis & Butt-head.

The video for "New Thing" was placed on New York Times list of the 15 Essential Hair-Metal Videos.

Track listing
Credits adapted from the original CD release.
All songs written by Donnie Vie and Chip Z'Nuff, except where noted.
 "New Thing"  – 4:22
 "She Wants More"  – 4:39
 "Fly High Michelle"  (Vie) – 4:17
 "Hot Little Summer Girl" (Vie, Ron Fajerstein) – 2:57
 "In the Groove"  – 6:49
 "Little Indian Angel"  – 3:30
 "For Now"  – 4:29
 "Kiss the Clown" (Vie) – 3:16
 "I Could Never Be Without You" (Vie) – 3:43
 "Finger on the Trigger" (Vie, Derek Frigo)  – 4:45

Personnel
Enuff Z'Nuff
Donnie Vie – lead vocals, rhythm guitar and keyboards
Derek Frigo – lead guitar
Chip Z'Nuff – bass, guitars and vocals
Vikki Fox – drums

Production
Ron Fajerstein – producer
Dan Harjung – engineer
Rich Denhart – additional engineering
Michael Koppelman, Dave Kent – assistant engineers
Paul Lani – mixing
George Marino – mastering at Sterling Sound, New York
Bob Defrin – art direction

Charts

Album

References 

1989 debut albums
Enuff Z'nuff albums
Atco Records albums